This is a list of butterflies of Liberia. About 530 species are known from Liberia, one of which, Leona na, is endemic.

Papilionidae

Papilioninae

Papilionini
Papilio antimachus Drury, 1782
Papilio zalmoxis Hewitson, 1864
Papilio nireus Linnaeus, 1758
Papilio chrapkowskoides nurettini Koçak, 1983
Papilio sosia Rothschild & Jordan, 1903
Papilio cynorta Fabricius, 1793
Papilio dardanus Brown, 1776
Papilio phorcas Cramer, 1775
Papilio zenobia Fabricius, 1775
Papilio cyproeofila Butler, 1868
Papilio demodocus Esper, [1798]
Papilio horribilis Butler, 1874
Papilio menestheus Drury, 1773

Leptocercini
Graphium antheus (Cramer, 1779)
Graphium policenes (Cramer, 1775)
Graphium illyris (Hewitson, 1873)
Graphium angolanus baronis (Ungemach, 1932)
Graphium leonidas (Fabricius, 1793)
Graphium tynderaeus (Fabricius, 1793)
Graphium latreillianus (Godart, 1819)

Pieridae

Pseudopontiinae
Pseudopontia paradoxa (Felder & Felder, 1869)

Coliadinae
Eurema brigitta (Stoll, [1780])
Eurema desjardinsii marshalli (Butler, 1898)
Eurema regularis (Butler, 1876)
Eurema hecabe solifera (Butler, 1875)
Eurema senegalensis (Boisduval, 1836)
Catopsilia florella (Fabricius, 1775)

Pierinae
Colotis euippe (Linnaeus, 1758)
Nepheronia argia (Fabricius, 1775)
Nepheronia pharis (Boisduval, 1836)
Nepheronia thalassina (Boisduval, 1836)
Leptosia alcesta (Stoll, [1782])
Leptosia hybrida Bernardi, 1952
Leptosia marginea (Mabille, 1890)
Leptosia medusa (Cramer, 1777)
Leptosia wigginsi pseudalcesta Bernardi, 1965

Pierini
Appias epaphia (Cramer, [1779])
Appias phaola (Doubleday, 1847)
Appias sabina (Felder & Felder, [1865])
Appias sylvia (Fabricius, 1775)
Pieris rapae (Linnaeus, 1758)
Mylothris chloris (Fabricius, 1775)
Mylothris jaopura Karsch, 1893
Mylothris poppea (Cramer, 1777)
Mylothris rhodope (Fabricius, 1775)
Mylothris schumanni Suffert, 1904
Mylothris dimidiata Aurivillius, 1898
Belenois calypso (Drury, 1773)
Belenois creona (Cramer, [1776])
Belenois hedyle rhena (Doubleday, 1846)
Belenois theora (Doubleday, 1846)

Lycaenidae

Miletinae

Liphyrini
Euliphyra hewitsoni Aurivillius, 1899
Euliphyra leucyania (Hewitson, 1874)
Aslauga marginalis Kirby, 1890

Miletini
Megalopalpus metaleucus Karsch, 1893
Megalopalpus zymna (Westwood, 1851)
Spalgis lemolea lemolea Druce, 1890
Spalgis lemolea pilos Druce, 1890
Lachnocnema emperamus (Snellen, 1872)
Lachnocnema vuattouxi Libert, 1996

Poritiinae

Liptenini
Ptelina carnuta (Hewitson, 1873)
Pentila abraxas (Westwood, 1851)
Pentila condamini Stempffer, 1963
Pentila hewitsoni (Grose-Smith & Kirby, 1887)
Pentila pauli Staudinger, 1888
Pentila petreia Hewitson, 1874
Pentila petreoides Bethune-Baker, 1915
Telipna acraea (Westwood, [1851])
Ornipholidotos tiassale Stempffer, 1969
Mimacraea darwinia Butler, 1872
Mimacraea neurata Holland, 1895
Mimeresia libentina (Hewitson, 1866)
Liptena albicans Cator, 1904
Liptena alluaudi Mabille, 1890
Liptena catalina (Grose-Smith & Kirby, 1887)
Liptena flavicans oniens Talbot, 1935
Liptena griveaudi Stempffer, 1969
Liptena helena (Druce, 1888)
Liptena praestans (Grose-Smith, 1901)
Liptena bia Larsen & Warren-Gash, 2008
Liptena similis (Kirby, 1890)
Liptena simplicia Möschler, 1887
Liptena submacula liberiana Stempffer, Bennett & May, 1974
Liptena xanthostola coomassiensis Hawker-Smith, 1933
Kakumia otlauga (Grose-Smith & Kirby, 1890)
Tetrarhanis diversa (Bethune-Baker, 1904)
Tetrarhanis stempfferi (Berger, 1954)
Tetrarhanis symplocus Clench, 1965
Falcuna campimus (Holland, 1890)
Falcuna leonensis Stempffer & Bennett, 1963
Larinopoda eurema (Plötz, 1880)
Micropentila brunnea (Kirby, 1887)
Micropentila dorothea Bethune-Baker, 1903
Pseuderesia eleaza (Hewitson, 1873)
Eresiomera bicolor (Grose-Smith & Kirby, 1890)
Eresiomera isca occidentalis Collins & Larsen, 1998
Eresiomera petersi (Stempffer & Bennett, 1956)
Citrinophila erastus (Hewitson, 1866)
Citrinophila marginalis Kirby, 1887

Epitolini
Iridana incredibilis (Staudinger, 1891)
Epitola urania Kirby, 1887
Epitola uranioides occidentalis Libert, 1999
Cerautola ceraunia (Hewitson, 1873)
Stempfferia dorothea (Bethune-Baker, 1904)
Stempfferia kholifa (Bethune-Baker, 1904)
Stempfferia michelae Libert, 1999
Cephetola obscura (Hawker-Smith, 1933)
Epitolina dispar (Kirby, 1887)
Epitolina melissa (Druce, 1888)
Hypophytala henleyi (Kirby, 1890)
Hypophytala hyettina (Aurivillius, 1897)
Phytala elais catori Bethune-Baker, 1903
Aethiopana honorius divisa (Butler, 1901)
Hewitsonia boisduvalii (Hewitson, 1869)
Hewitsonia inexpectata Bouyer, 1997

Aphnaeinae
Pseudaletis zebra subangulata Talbot, 1935
Lipaphnaeus aderna (Plötz, 1880)
Lipaphnaeus leonina leonina (Sharpe, 1890)
Lipaphnaeus leonina ivoirensis Stempffer, 1966
Cigaritis iza (Hewitson, 1865)
Cigaritis mozambica (Bertoloni, 1850)
Axiocerses harpax (Fabricius, 1775)
Aphnaeus orcas (Drury, 1782)

Theclinae
Myrina silenus (Fabricius, 1775)
Oxylides faunus (Drury, 1773)
Dapidodigma hymen (Fabricius, 1775)
Hypolycaena antifaunus (Westwood, 1851)
Hypolycaena clenchi Larsen, 1997
Hypolycaena dubia Aurivillius, 1895
Hypolycaena hatita Hewitson, 1865
Hypolycaena lebona (Hewitson, 1865)
Hypolycaena liara Druce, 1890
Hypolycaena nigra Bethune-Baker, 1914
Hypolycaena philippus (Fabricius, 1793)
Hypolycaena scintillans Stempffer, 1957
Iolaus aethria Karsch, 1893
Iolaus bellina (Plötz, 1880)
Iolaus leonis (Riley, 1928)
Iolaus iasis Hewitson, 1865
Iolaus moyambina (Stempffer & Bennett, 1959)
Iolaus sappirus (Druce, 1902)
Iolaus iulus Hewitson, 1869
Iolaus catori Bethune-Baker, 1904
Pilodeudorix virgata (Druce, 1891)
Pilodeudorix caerulea (Druce, 1890)
Pilodeudorix camerona (Plötz, 1880)
Pilodeudorix diyllus (Hewitson, 1878)
Pilodeudorix zela (Hewitson, 1869)
Pilodeudorix aurivilliusi (Stempffer, 1954)
Pilodeudorix violetta (Aurivillius, 1897)
Paradeudorix eleala viridis (Stempffer, 1964)
Paradeudorix petersi (Stempffer & Bennett, 1956)
Hypomyrina mimetica Libert, 2004
Deudorix antalus (Hopffer, 1855)
Deudorix galathea (Swainson, 1821)
Deudorix lorisona (Hewitson, 1862)

Polyommatinae

Lycaenesthini
Anthene amarah (Guérin-Méneville, 1849)
Anthene georgiadisi Larsen, 2009
Anthene juba (Fabricius, 1787)
Anthene lachares (Hewitson, 1878)
Anthene larydas (Cramer, 1780)
Anthene liodes (Hewitson, 1874)
Anthene lunulata (Trimen, 1894)
Anthene lysicles (Hewitson, 1874)
Anthene mahota (Grose-Smith, 1887)
Anthene princeps (Butler, 1876)
Anthene radiata (Bethune-Baker, 1910)
Anthene rubricinctus (Holland, 1891)
Anthene sylvanus (Drury, 1773)
Anthene lyzanius (Hewitson, 1874)
Anthene chryseostictus (Bethune-Baker, 1910)
Anthene fasciatus (Aurivillius, 1895)
Anthene hades (Bethune-Baker, 1910)
Anthene lamias (Hewitson, 1878)
Anthene rufoplagata (Bethune-Baker, 1910)
Cupidesthes lithas (Druce, 1890)

Polyommatini
Cupidopsis cissus (Godart, [1824])
Pseudonacaduba sichela (Wallengren, 1857)
Lampides boeticus (Linnaeus, 1767)
Uranothauma falkensteini (Dewitz, 1879)
Phlyaria cyara stactalla Karsch, 1895
Cacyreus audeoudi Stempffer, 1936
Cacyreus lingeus (Stoll, 1782)
Leptotes pirithous (Linnaeus, 1767)
Leptotes pulchra (Murray, 1874)
Tuxentius carana kontu (Karsch, 1893)
Zizeeria knysna (Trimen, 1862)
Zizina antanossa (Mabille, 1877)
Zizula hylax (Fabricius, 1775)
Azanus mirza (Plötz, 1880)
Azanus isis (Drury, 1773)
Eicochrysops hippocrates (Fabricius, 1793)
Euchrysops albistriata greenwoodi d'Abrera, 1980
Euchrysops malathana (Boisduval, 1833)
Euchrysops osiris (Hopffer, 1855)
Thermoniphas micylus (Cramer, 1780)
Oboronia guessfeldti (Dewitz, 1879)
Oboronia liberiana Stempffer, 1950
Oboronia ornata (Mabille, 1890)
Oboronia punctatus (Dewitz, 1879)
Lepidochrysops synchrematiza (Bethune-Baker, [1923])

Riodinidae

Nemeobiinae
Abisara tantalus (Hewitson, 1861)
Abisara gerontes (Fabricius, 1781)

Nymphalidae

Libytheinae
Libythea labdaca Westwood, 1851

Danainae

Danaini
Danaus chrysippus alcippus (Cramer, 1777)
Amauris niavius (Linnaeus, 1758)
Amauris tartarea Mabille, 1876
Amauris damocles (Fabricius, 1793)
Amauris hecate (Butler, 1866)

Satyrinae

Elymniini
Elymniopsis bammakoo (Westwood, [1851])

Melanitini
Gnophodes betsimena parmeno Doubleday, 1849
Gnophodes chelys (Fabricius, 1793)
Melanitis leda (Linnaeus, 1758)

Satyrini
Bicyclus angulosa (Butler, 1868)
Bicyclus auricruda (Butler, 1868)
Bicyclus dekeyseri (Condamin, 1958)
Bicyclus dorothea (Cramer, 1779)
Bicyclus ephorus Weymer, 1892
Bicyclus evadne (Cramer, 1779)
Bicyclus funebris (Guérin-Méneville, 1844)
Bicyclus ignobilis (Butler, 1870)
Bicyclus istaris (Plötz, 1880)
Bicyclus madetes (Hewitson, 1874)
Bicyclus mandanes Hewitson, 1873
Bicyclus nobilis (Aurivillius, 1893)
Bicyclus procora (Karsch, 1893)
Bicyclus safitza (Westwood, 1850)
Bicyclus sambulos unicolor Condamin, 1971
Bicyclus martius (Fabricius, 1793)
Bicyclus sandace (Hewitson, 1877)
Bicyclus sangmelinae Condamin, 1963
Bicyclus taenias (Hewitson, 1877)
Bicyclus vulgaris (Butler, 1868)
Bicyclus zinebi (Butler, 1869)
Hallelesis halyma (Fabricius, 1793)
Heteropsis peitho (Plötz, 1880)
Ypthima doleta Kirby, 1880
Ypthima impura Elwes & Edwards, 1893
Ypthimomorpha itonia (Hewitson, 1865)

Charaxinae

Charaxini
Charaxes varanes vologeses (Mabille, 1876)
Charaxes fulvescens senegala van Someren, 1975
Charaxes protoclea Feisthamel, 1850
Charaxes boueti Feisthamel, 1850
Charaxes cynthia Butler, 1866
Charaxes lucretius Cramer, [1775]
Charaxes jasius Poulton, 1926
Charaxes epijasius Reiche, 1850
Charaxes castor (Cramer, 1775)
Charaxes brutus (Cramer, 1779)
Charaxes pollux (Cramer, 1775)
Charaxes eudoxus (Drury, 1782)
Charaxes numenes (Hewitson, 1859)
Charaxes tiridates (Cramer, 1777)
Charaxes smaragdalis butleri Rothschild, 1900
Charaxes imperialis Butler, 1874
Charaxes ameliae doumeti Henning, 1989
Charaxes hadrianus Ward, 1871
Charaxes zingha (Stoll, 1780)
Charaxes etesipe (Godart, 1824)
Charaxes eupale (Drury, 1782)
Charaxes anticlea (Drury, 1782)
Charaxes etheocles (Cramer, 1777)
Charaxes cedreatis Hewitson, 1874
Charaxes pleione (Godart, 1824)
Charaxes paphianus falcata (Butler, 1872)
Charaxes nichetes bouchei Plantrou, 1974
Charaxes lycurgus (Fabricius, 1793)
Charaxes mycerina (Godart, 1824)
Charaxes petersi van Someren, 1969

Euxanthini
Charaxes eurinome (Cramer, 1775)

Pallini
Palla ussheri (Butler, 1870)
Palla decius (Cramer, 1777)
Palla violinitens (Crowley, 1890)

Nymphalinae
Kallimoides rumia (Doubleday, 1849)
Vanessula milca (Hewitson, 1873)

Nymphalini
Antanartia delius (Drury, 1782)
Junonia oenone (Linnaeus, 1758)
Junonia orithya madagascariensis Guenée, 1865
Junonia sophia (Fabricius, 1793)
Junonia stygia (Aurivillius, 1894)
Junonia terea (Drury, 1773)
Salamis cacta (Fabricius, 1793)
Protogoniomorpha parhassus (Drury, 1782)
Protogoniomorpha cytora (Doubleday, 1847)
Precis frobeniusi Strand, 1909
Precis octavia (Cramer, 1777)
Precis pelarga (Fabricius, 1775)
Precis sinuata Plötz, 1880
Hypolimnas anthedon (Doubleday, 1845)
Hypolimnas dinarcha (Hewitson, 1865)
Hypolimnas misippus (Linnaeus, 1764)
Hypolimnas salmacis (Drury, 1773)
Catacroptera cloanthe ligata Rothschild & Jordan, 1903

Cyrestinae

Cyrestini
Cyrestis camillus (Fabricius, 1781)

Biblidinae

Biblidini
Mesoxantha ethosea (Drury, 1782)
Ariadne albifascia (Joicey & Talbot, 1921)
Ariadne enotrea (Cramer, 1779)
Neptidopsis ophione (Cramer, 1777)
Eurytela dryope (Cramer, [1775])
Eurytela hiarbas (Drury, 1782)

Limenitinae

Limenitidini
Harma theobene Doubleday, 1848
Cymothoe althea (Cramer, 1776)
Cymothoe caenis (Drury, 1773)
Cymothoe egesta (Cramer, 1775)
Cymothoe fumana (Westwood, 1850)
Cymothoe hartigi Belcastro, 1990
Cymothoe herminia gongoa Fox, 1965
Cymothoe jodutta (Westwood, 1850)
Cymothoe mabillei Overlaet, 1944
Cymothoe sangaris (Godart, 1824)
Cymothoe weymeri mulatta Belcastro, 1990
Pseudoneptis bugandensis ianthe Hemming, 1964
Pseudacraea boisduvalii (Doubleday, 1845)
Pseudacraea eurytus (Linnaeus, 1758)
Pseudacraea hostilia (Drury, 1782)
Pseudacraea lucretia (Cramer, [1775])
Pseudacraea semire (Cramer, 1779)
Pseudacraea warburgi Aurivillius, 1892

Neptidini
Neptis agouale Pierre-Baltus, 1978
Neptis alta Overlaet, 1955
Neptis melicerta (Drury, 1773)
Neptis metella (Doubleday, 1848)
Neptis nebrodes Hewitson, 1874
Neptis nemetes Hewitson, 1868
Neptis nicobule Holland, 1892
Neptis nicoteles Hewitson, 1874
Neptis nysiades Hewitson, 1868
Neptis paula Staudinger, 1896
Neptis trigonophora melicertula Strand, 1912
Neptis troundi Pierre-Baltus, 1978

Adoliadini
Catuna angustatum (Felder & Felder, 1867)
Catuna crithea (Drury, 1773)
Catuna niji Fox, 1965
Catuna oberthueri Karsch, 1894
Euryphura chalcis (Felder & Felder, 1860)
Euryphurana nobilis (Staudinger, 1891)
Hamanumida daedalus (Fabricius, 1775)
Aterica galene (Brown, 1776)
Cynandra opis (Drury, 1773)
Euriphene amicia gola Fox, 1965
Euriphene ampedusa (Hewitson, 1866)
Euriphene aridatha (Hewitson, 1866)
Euriphene taigola Sáfián & Warren-Gash, 2009
Euriphene aridatha feronia (Staudinger, 1891)
Euriphene atossa (Hewitson, 1865)
Euriphene coerulea Boisduval, 1847
Euriphene gambiae vera Hecq, 2002
Euriphene leonis (Aurivillius, 1899)
Euriphene simplex (Staudinger, 1891)
Euriphene veronica (Stoll, 1780)
Euriphene doriclea (Drury, 1782)
Bebearia osyris (Schultze, 1920)
Bebearia carshena (Hewitson, 1871)
Bebearia absolon (Fabricius, 1793)
Bebearia zonara (Butler, 1871)
Bebearia mandinga (Felder & Felder, 1860)
Bebearia oxione (Hewitson, 1866)
Bebearia abesa (Hewitson, 1869)
Bebearia barce (Doubleday, 1847)
Bebearia mardania (Fabricius, 1793)
Bebearia cocalia (Fabricius, 1793)
Bebearia sophus (Fabricius, 1793)
Bebearia arcadius (Fabricius, 1793)
Bebearia laetitia (Plötz, 1880)
Bebearia phantasina (Staudinger, 1891)
Bebearia demetra (Godart, 1824)
Bebearia maledicta (Strand, 1912)
Bebearia cutteri harleyi (Fox, 1968)
Euphaedra medon (Linnaeus, 1763)
Euphaedra gausape (Butler, 1866)
Euphaedra judith Weymer, 1892
Euphaedra melpomene Hecq, 1981
Euphaedra xypete (Hewitson, 1865)
Euphaedra hebes Hecq, 1980
Euphaedra diffusa albocoerulea Hecq, 1976
Euphaedra crockeri (Butler, 1869)
Euphaedra eusemoides (Grose-Smith & Kirby, 1889)
Euphaedra cyparissa (Cramer, 1775)
Euphaedra themis (Hübner, 1807)
Euphaedra laboureana eburnensis Hecq, 1979
Euphaedra janetta (Butler, 1871)
Euphaedra ceres (Fabricius, 1775)
Euphaedra phaethusa aurea Hecq, 1983
Euphaedra francina (Godart, 1824)
Euphaedra eleus (Drury, 1782)
Euphaedra zampa (Westwood, 1850)
Euphaedra edwardsii (van der Hoeven, 1845)
Euphaedra perseis (Drury, 1773)
Euphaedra harpalyce (Cramer, 1777)
Euphaedra eupalus (Fabricius, 1781)
Euptera plantroui Chovet & Collins, 1998
Euptera pluto occidentalis Chovet, 1998
Euptera zowa Fox, 1965
Pseudathyma plutonica sibyllina (Staudinger, 1890)

Heliconiinae

Acraeini
Acraea camaena (Drury, 1773)
Acraea neobule Doubleday, 1847
Acraea quirina (Fabricius, 1781)
Acraea zetes (Linnaeus, 1758)
Acraea abdera eginopsis Aurivillius, 1899
Acraea egina (Cramer, 1775)
Acraea caecilia (Fabricius, 1781)
Acraea pseudegina Westwood, 1852
Acraea rogersi Hewitson, 1873
Acraea alcinoe Felder & Felder, 1865
Acraea consanguinea sartina (Jordan, 1910)
Acraea epaea (Cramer, 1779)
Acraea macaria (Fabricius, 1793)
Acraea umbra (Drury, 1782)
Acraea vestalis Felder & Felder, 1865
Acraea acerata Hewitson, 1874
Acraea alciope Hewitson, 1852
Acraea pseudepaea Dudgeon, 1909
Acraea aurivillii Staudinger, 1896
Acraea bonasia (Fabricius, 1775)
Acraea circeis (Drury, 1782)
Acraea encedana Pierre, 1976
Acraea encedon (Linnaeus, 1758)
Acraea serena (Fabricius, 1775)
Acraea jodutta (Fabricius, 1793)
Acraea lycoa Godart, 1819
Acraea polis Pierre, 1999
Acraea pharsalus Ward, 1871
Acraea parrhasia (Fabricius, 1793)
Acraea perenna Doubleday, 1847

Vagrantini
Lachnoptera anticlia (Hübner, 1819)
Phalanta eurytis (Doubleday, 1847)
Phalanta phalantha aethiopica (Rothschild & Jordan, 1903)

Hesperiidae

Coeliadinae
Coeliades chalybe (Westwood, 1852)
Coeliades forestan (Stoll, [1782])
Coeliades hanno (Plötz, 1879)
Coeliades libeon (Druce, 1875)
Coeliades pisistratus (Fabricius, 1793)
Pyrrhiades lucagus (Cramer, 1777)
Pyrrhochalcia iphis (Drury, 1773)

Pyrginae

Celaenorrhinini
Loxolexis hollandi (Druce, 1909)
Celaenorrhinus galenus (Fabricius, 1793)
Celaenorrhinus ovalis Evans, 1937
Celaenorrhinus plagiatus Berger, 1976
Celaenorrhinus proxima maesseni Berger, 1976
Eretis lugens (Rogenhofer, 1891)
Eretis melania Mabille, 1891
Sarangesa bouvieri (Mabille, 1877)
Sarangesa brigida (Plötz, 1879)
Sarangesa majorella (Mabille, 1891)
Sarangesa tertullianus (Fabricius, 1793)
Sarangesa thecla (Plötz, 1879)

Tagiadini
Tagiades flesus (Fabricius, 1781)
Eagris denuba (Plötz, 1879)
Eagris tetrastigma subolivescens (Holland, 1892)
Calleagris lacteus dannatti (Ehrmann, 1893)
Procampta rara Holland, 1892

Carcharodini
Spialia diomus (Hopffer, 1855)
Spialia ploetzi occidentalis de Jong, 1977
Spialia spio (Linnaeus, 1764)

Hesperiinae

Aeromachini
Astictopterus abjecta (Snellen, 1872)
Astictopterus anomoeus (Plötz, 1879)
Prosopalpus debilis (Plötz, 1879)
Gorgyra aburae (Plötz, 1879)
Gorgyra aretina (Hewitson, 1878)
Gorgyra bina Evans, 1937
Gorgyra diversata Evans, 1937
Gorgyra heterochrus (Mabille, 1890)
Gorgyra minima Holland, 1896
Gorgyra mocquerysii Holland, 1896
Gorgyra pali Evans, 1937
Gorgyra sara Evans, 1937
Gorgyra sola Evans, 1937
Gorgyra subfacatus (Mabille, 1890)
Teniorhinus ignita (Mabille, 1877)
Teniorhinus watsoni Holland, 1892
Ceratrichia crowleyi Riley, 1925
Ceratrichia nothus (Fabricius, 1787)
Ceratrichia phocion (Fabricius, 1781)
Ceratrichia semilutea Mabille, 1891
Pardaleodes edipus (Stoll, 1781)
Pardaleodes sator (Westwood, 1852)
Pardaleodes tibullus (Fabricius, 1793)
Xanthodisca astrape (Holland, 1892)
Xanthodisca rega (Mabille, 1890)
Rhabdomantis galatia (Hewitson, 1868)
Rhabdomantis sosia (Mabille, 1891)
Osmodes adosus (Mabille, 1890)
Osmodes distincta Holland, 1896
Osmodes laronia (Hewitson, 1868)
Osmodes lindseyi occidentalis Miller, 1971
Osmodes lux Holland, 1892
Osmodes omar Swinhoe, 1916
Osmodes thora (Plötz, 1884)
Parosmodes lentiginosa (Holland, 1896)
Paracleros biguttulus (Mabille, 1890)
Acleros mackenii olaus (Plötz, 1884)
Acleros nigrapex Strand, 1913
Acleros ploetzi Mabille, 1890
Semalea arela (Mabille, 1891)
Semalea pulvina (Plötz, 1879)
Semalea sextilis (Plötz, 1886)
Hypoleucis tripunctata Mabille, 1891
Meza indusiata (Mabille, 1891)
Meza leucophaea (Holland, 1894)
Meza mabillei (Holland, 1893)
Meza meza (Hewitson, 1877)
Andronymus caesar (Fabricius, 1793)
Andronymus evander (Mabille, 1890)
Andronymus helles Evans, 1937
Andronymus hero Evans, 1937
Andronymus neander (Plötz, 1884)
Zophopetes cerymica (Hewitson, 1867)
Artitropa comus (Stoll, 1782)
Mopala orma (Plötz, 1879)
Gretna balenge zowa Lindsey & Miller, 1965
Gretna cylinda (Hewitson, 1876)
Gretna lacida (Hewitson, 1876)
Gretna waga (Plötz, 1886)
Pteroteinon caenira (Hewitson, 1867)
Pteroteinon ceucaenira (Druce, 1910)
Pteroteinon iricolor (Holland, 1890)
Pteroteinon laufella (Hewitson, 1868)
Leona leonora (Plötz, 1879)
Leona na (Lindsey & Miller, 1965)
Leona meloui (Riley, 1926)
Caenides soritia (Hewitson, 1876)
Caenides benga (Holland, 1891)
Caenides dacela (Hewitson, 1876)
Caenides hidaroides Aurivillius, 1896
Monza alberti (Holland, 1896)
Monza cretacea (Snellen, 1872)
Melphina malthina (Hewitson, 1876)
Melphina statirides (Holland, 1896)
Melphina unistriga (Holland, 1893)
Fresna netopha (Hewitson, 1878)
Platylesches chamaeleon (Mabille, 1891)
Platylesches galesa (Hewitson, 1877)
Platylesches picanini (Holland, 1894)

Baorini
Pelopidas mathias (Fabricius, 1798)
Borbo borbonica (Boisduval, 1833)
Borbo fatuellus (Hopffer, 1855)
Borbo holtzi (Plötz, 1883)
Borbo perobscura (Druce, 1912)
Gegenes niso brevicornis (Plötz, 1884)

See also
 List of moths of Liberia

Geography:
Geography of Liberia
Western Guinean lowland forests
Guinean lowland forests
Guinean montane forests
Upper Guinean forests

General:
 Wildlife of Liberia

References

Seitz, A. Die Gross-Schmetterlinge der Erde 13: Die Afrikanischen Tagfalter. Plates
Seitz, A. Die Gross-Schmetterlinge der Erde 13: Die Afrikanischen Tagfalter. Text 

Liberia

Liberia
Butterflies